A Landscape with a Ruined Castle and a Church (c. 1665) is an oil on canvas painting by the Dutch landscape painter Jacob van Ruisdael.
It is an example of Dutch Golden Age painting and is now in the collection of the National Gallery.

Description 
This painting was documented by Hofstede de Groot in 1911, who wrote; "136. Landscape with Cornfields, and Sheep and Figures. 
Sm. 214. A far-reaching view across an open plain varied with woods, meadows, and cornfields, villages and churches amid trees, cottages and 
windmills. In front are the ruins of a castle with a stagnant moat, fringed with trees and underwood. On the left a winding road passes a cornfield with sheaves and a group of trees and is lost in the distance. A shepherd sits on the old castle-wall, conversing with a youth seated on the ground, near a dog and three sheep. On a bastion, on the other side, are three sheep; in a breach of the bastion stands a man. On a pool are three swans. The figures and cattle are by A. van de Velde. A thunderstorm has just passed over. In the sky are masses of rolling cloud, through which sunbeams fall on windmills in the distance. The rest of the landscape is in partial shadow. "This capital picture may be cited as a chef d'oeuvre of the artist in this peculiar department of landscape-painting " (Sm.). [Compare 775, 776.] Canvas, 43 inches by 57 inches. Exhibited at Manchester, 1857, No. 699, by R. Sanderson. Sale. Jan Gildemeester, Amsterdam, June 11, 1800, No. 190 (315 florins, 
Tays). In the collection of the Marquis de Marialva, Paris, 1825; bought privately by Sm. Sales. John Smith, London, 1828 (£472 : 10s.). 
Abrahams, London, 1831 (£275). In the collection of Richard Sanderson, London, 1835 (Sm.). Sale. R. Sanderson, London, June 17, 1848 (£504, Brown); but apparently 
bought in, for it was in the Sanderson collection in 1854 (Waagen, ii. 288), and was lent from it to Manchester in 1857. "

This scene is very similar to other paintings Ruisdael made in this period.

References

External links

Weids landschap met kasteelruïne en kerktoren, ca. 1665–1670 (Slive 2001; zie bronnen) in the RKD
214. A Landscape in Smith's catalogue raisonné volume 6, 1835, and illustrated here

1650s paintings
Paintings by Jacob van Ruisdael
Collections of the National Gallery, London
Water in art
Churches in art